Chatuzange-le-Goubet (Vivaro-Alpine: Chatusange e los Gobets) is a commune in the Drôme department in southeastern France. A hoard of Roman silver objects was found in the commune in the nineteenth century. Known as the Chatuzange Treasure, it can now be seen in the British Museum.

Population

See also
Communes of the Drôme department

References

Communes of Drôme